The Indonesian Workers and Employers Party is a political party in Indonesia. The party aims to integrate the struggle of Indonesian employers and workers. It contested the 2009 elections, but won only 0.7 percent of the vote, less than the 2.5 percent electoral threshold, meaning it was awarded no seats in the People's Representative Council.

Regional strength
In the legislative election held on 9 April 2009, support for the PPPI was higher than the party's national average in the following provinces:

Aceh 0.9%

West Sumatra 0.7%

Bengkulu 1.0%

South Sumatra 0.7%

Lampung 0.8%

Yogyakarta 0.8%

West Kalimantan 0.8%

Central Kalimantan 0.9%

South Kalimantan 0.7%

East Kalimantan 0.9%

Bali 1.5%

West Nusa Tenggara 1.3%

East Nusa Tenggara 1.3%

West Sulawesi 3.0%

Central Sulawesi 0.8%

South East Sulawesi 1.0%

North Maluku 0.9%

West Papua 1.1%

References

2002 establishments in Indonesia
Pancasila political parties
Political parties established in 2002
Political parties in Indonesia
Social democratic parties in Asia
Socialist parties in Indonesia